Heterosporium is a genus of fungi belonging to the family Cladosporiaceae.

The genus has almost cosmopolitan distribution.

Species

Species:

Heterosporium alhagi 
Heterosporium amsoniae 
Heterosporium asperatum

References

Capnodiales